Sri Sai Gurucharitra is a biography on the life of Sai Baba of Shirdi, written by his devotee Ganpatrao Dattatreya Sahasra-buddhe, better known as Das Ganu Maharaj.

Background 
Das Ganu was a havildar (policeman) by profession, but was eventually persuaded by Shirdi Sai Baba to give up his job, after which he became a much sought-after kirtankar: someone who sings kirtans or religious songs. He also talked of saints that he had met or that inspired him. 
Later in life, Das Ganu wrote three books on different saints, in which he devoted four chapters to Sai Baba. These books are called 'Bhakta Leelamrita', 'Bhakti Saramrita' and 'Sant Kathamrita'. The four chapters have been combined into one book, under the title of "Shri Sai Gurucharitra", and were translated into English in 1949, from a Telugu version by "Sri SVL" with an introductory preface by Sri Sainathuni Sarathbabuji.Das Ganu Maharaj's father was originally from Jath State.When the boy was eight years old his family shifted to Nanded of Nizam's state.

Contents 
The Shri Sai Gurucharitra is divided into seven chapters. 
 Chapter one is a collection of short stories about the life and miracles of Sai Baba of Shirdi.
 Chapter two to four contain longwinded explanations ascribed to Sai Baba by Das Ganu. In these three chapters, Sai Baba allegedly explained in depth about the origins of karma, the effects of karma, and the means to escape the effects of karma, and how to avoid generating karma altogether. Sai Baba supposedly teaches his devotee Nanasaheb Chandorkar spiritual lessons in this way. As can be read below, Das Ganu combined several short lessons that Chandorkar heard from Sai Baba and expanded on them.
 Chapter five is devoted to the life of Maharashtra saint Gopalrao Desmukh, a desmukh who according to Das Ganu became the guru of Sai Baba when the latter was still very young. The chapter describes Gopalrao's spiritual development, his encounter with the child who was to become Sai Baba and their parting. This part is highly speculative, as Das Ganu himself admits.
 Chapter six and seven are short stories about the life and miracles of Sai Baba again.

Not verifiable 
It is not recorded in other sources if Sai Baba ever made such longwinded speeches about spirituality. It was his manner to seize the moment to teach in small sentences and short words . Some of his teachings are available in the form of aphorisms. He never explained the spiritual truths in the style as was shown in these chapters. It is therefore evident that the long passages attributed to Baba in Das Ganu's books or in later histories of Baba are not verbatim transcripts of his teachings.

So Das Ganu Maharaj not always recorded a strictly literal version of Sai Baba's sayings. A detailed explanation by Das Ganu Maharaj may be seen in the 31st chapter of "Bhakta Leelamrit", where he says: 
"Some facts, i.e. autobiographical reminiscences, came from Baba's own mouth. But they were very few. Besides, I had not spent much time with Baba. I rarely saw him. When I was at Shirdi, Baba did not allow me to stay long at the masjid. He made me go away to the Vittal temple where I stayed to write lives of saints, or to spend my time in repetition of Vishnu Sahasranama etc. I made some inquiries about Baba also before writing these works. Some facts were within my personal knowledge. I was in active (police) service as a havildar. 
Three chapters of the book were read as a Poti (holy scripture) at the mosque before Baba, and he said, "It is alright", when Nana Saheb Chandorkar gave him the book. The instruction given to Chandorkar by Baba was mentioned to me by Chandorkar. I expanded it with my own learning and gave it its present shape, but the kernel of it was given by Chandorkar. Baba has several times talked Advaitic philosophy in my presence.

 Santakathamrita 
The Santakathamrita was the first book I wrote about Sai Baba. This was written bit by bit when I was in service i.e., before 1903, both the portions about Baba and about others. But it was printed in 1903. Baba blessed the effort. None of my books was read to Baba. Nor was Baba asked before-hand to give the information for writing the books. What he spoke of his own accord was picked up. Baba had talked of his "Selu" antecedents and I made inquiries at Selu about Baba's antecedents. Baba said about each book when placed in his hand, That is alright". I do not know whether Baba knew how to write, read or even to sign his name.

The account given in it (in chapter 28) about Baba's antecedents at Selu is based partly on Baba's statements and partly on what the villagers of Selu told me. The only thing Baba said of Selu and the Selu period was that he came from Selu. So I started while I was in service and went to Selu to make enquiries. I cannot specify any villager as having told me anything in particular. My inquiry was 35 years back. The villagers said that there was an old Saint, that a young boy was being trained by him, that some got vexed with the Saint and threw stones at him and killed him and that the boy escaped and that all this took place 100 years previously. Sai Baba told me, in the presence of Chandorkar, that the brick he used as a pillow at Shirdi and which is still retained as a relic of Baba at Shirdi was given by his Guru to him, that his Guru was "Venkusa". The version about Baba's telling Chandorkar is my own, as I wished to avoid dragging my own name into my own work and figuring in it too prominently. Chandorkar did not know if he maintained a diary or note of his experiences."
Das Ganu gave the explanation about the teachings contained in these chapters on another occasion: 
"The teachings I have attributed to Baba as having been told to Nanasaheb Chandorkar is not a verbatim transcription. Nana told me of some spiritual truths revealed to him by Baba. I used my imagination to enlarge and expound upon these matters. Baba had merely taught the essence."

 Bhakti Lilamrita 
"Next came Bhakti Lilamrita. This was published in Baba's lifetime, in 1906. There were three chapters (31, 32 and 33 of the book) that were about Sai Baba. These were read as Poti (i.e. holy scripture) at the mosque before Baba.

 Bhakti Saramrita 
Lastly came the Bhakti Saramrita. The two chapters relating to Baba therein, no. 52-53, were placed in his hands and he said, "alright". But other chapters were composed later from time to time mostly after 1918; in 1925 this book was printed as a whole."

This is the first fictional story, which tells of Sri Sai Baba's birth and antecedents. There is no authentic proof to the facts narrated in this. Das Ganu Maharaj himself revealed this subsequently. In the 31st chapter of "Bhakta Leelamrit" he says, 
"No one knows his antecedents or his previous history. What can I tell you of these details when I too am as ignorant as the others? If anyone asked Baba this question, he would answer, "As the rain falls when the clouds in the sky peal with thunder, I too have fallen on this earth. I have no name or place. I am without any attributes. I have assumed this body due to the inevitable karma, which does its work, immutable and unalterable. I am known everywhere as a body. The whole world is my abode. Brahman is my father- the impenetrable Maya is my mother. It is by their conjoining that I have assumed this body which you see with your eyes." 
What is interesting in this quote is that even here, Das Ganu ascribes words to Sai Baba that are more his own than Sai Baba's.

Later, in 1925, or 7 years after Baba's mahasamadhi, Sri Das Ganu included his story about Gopalrao Desmukh of Selu in 'Bhakti Saaramrit'. That chapter has not been read in the presence of Sri Sai Baba in the Masjid.

See also 
 Short version of the Sri Sai Satcharitra by Hemadpant in pdf
Short version of the Sri Sai Satcharitra by Hemadpant online
Short version of the Sri Sai Satcharitra by Hemadpant in epub
Shri Sai Samarth charita: Full version of the Sri Sai Satcharitra by Hemadpant in 56 pdf's

== References ==

External links 
 http://www.santkavidasganu.org
 Shri Sai Gurucharitra in English. Full text in pdf and epub
 Account by Das Ganu Maharaj on his books and his experiences with Sai Baba of Shirdi

Hindu texts
Indian biographies
Sai Baba of Shirdi